The Country Progressive Party was a political party in the Australian state of Victoria from 1926 to 1930. It was a splinter group from the Victorian Country Party. It was formed by federal MP Percy Stewart and future Victorian Premier Albert Dunstan in protest over protection of sitting members and state governments. Stewart was the party's only federal MP, while it elected four state MPs at the 1927 and 1929 Victorian state elections. The Country Progressives reunited with the main party in 1930.

Much like the Victorian Country Party was associated with the branches of the Victorian Farmers Union, the Country Progressive Party established the Primary Producers Union which established branches in parts of Victoria.

Election results

House of Representatives

Victorian Legislative Assembly

Further reading

References

Defunct political parties in Victoria (Australia)
National Party of Australia
Political parties established in 1926
1926 establishments in Australia
Political parties disestablished in 1930
1930 disestablishments in Australia